Roberts is a village in Ford County, Illinois, United States. The population was 362 at the 2010 census.

History
Roberts was named for the first permanent settlers in the area, Jesse and Livingston Roberts.

Geography
Roberts is located at  (40.613310, -88.182685).

Demographics

As of the census of 2000, there were 387 people, 169 households, and 103 families residing in the village. The racial makeup of the village was 98.97% White and 1.03% Native American. Hispanic or Latino of any race were 1.29% of the population.

There were 169 households, out of which 24.9% had children under the age of 18 living with them, 53.3% were married couples living together, 7.7% had a female householder with no husband present, and 38.5% were non-families. 33.7% of all households were made up of individuals, and 21.9% had someone living alone who was 65 years of age or older.  The average household size was 2.29 and the average family size was 2.99.

In the village, the population was spread out, with 23.8% under the age of 18, 5.4% from 18 to 24, 25.8% from 25 to 44, 23.0% from 45 to 64, and 22.0% who were 65 years of age or older.  The median age was 42 years. For every 100 females, there were 80.0 males.  For every 100 females age 18 and over, there were 82.1 males.

The median income for a household in the village was $32,321, and the median income for a family was $50,000. Males had a median income of $31,250 versus $21,875 for females. The per capita income for the village was $17,926.  About 5.0% of families and 7.5% of the population were below the poverty line, including 19.2% of those under age 18 and 2.4% of those age 65 or over.

References

Villages in Ford County, Illinois
Villages in Illinois